Laetilia ephestiella is a species of snout moth in the genus Laetilia. It was described by Ragonot in 1887. It is found in the southern United States, including California, Arizona and Texas.

References

Moths described in 1887
Phycitini